Sullivan was a three-act comedy by Anne-Honoré-Joseph Duveyrier de Mélésville, based on the short story Garrick Médecin. It was first played at Paris, in the Théâtre-Français, November 11, 1852. The original cast was:

Nicol Jenkins, a wealthy merchant - Mr. Provost

Lèlia, his daughter - Ms. Favart

Sullivan, a comic actor from Drury Lane Theater - Mr. Brindeau

Sir Frédéric Dumple, nephew of Jenkins - Got

Saunders, a broker - Anselme
Mistress Saunders, his wife - Mrs. Thénard
Merwyn, a silks merchant - Mr. Montet
Miss Pénélope, his sister - Ms. Joussain
Peacock, a lawyer - Mr. Mirecourt
Little-John, Jenkins' valet - Castel
Dickson, Sullivan's valet - Mathien
An Alderman
Servants

Though Garrick Médecin had focused on the adventures of actor David Garrick, de Mélésville did not wish to do a historical piece, and so used the then-contemporary Shakespearean actor Barry Sullivan as his subject, though he changed the character's first name in the play to George, probably to avoid any possible legal troubles. A few years after it was produced, Sullivan was adapted into the English play David Garrick by Robertson, with Garrick returned to the leading role.

External links 
 Sullivan, first edition (in French) - Google Books

1852 plays